Bernardo Caprotti (7 October 1925 – 30 September 2016) was an Italian billionaire businessman, the owner of Esselunga, Italy's third-largest grocery store chain.

In his will, he left 66.7% of Esselunga to his second wife Giuliana Albera and their daughter Marina Sylvia, and 16.7% to each of his children from his first marriage, his son Giuseppe Caprotti and his daughter Violetta.

References

1925 births
2016 deaths
Italian billionaires
Italian businesspeople